Rawabi Abraj Al Bait Towers (Arabic: روابي أبراج البيت) project, consisting of 21 towers, is a proposed real estate development in Mecca, Saudi Arabia. It features restaurants, medical facilities, parking, 24/7 security, high-speed elevators and shopping malls.

About
This project is developed by Esdarat Holding Company a Kuwaiti company with capital of $377 million launched the private replacement of 600 million shares to fund this project making Rawabi Abraj Al Bait the largest privately owned development in center of Mecca and also Esdarat said this projects will be completed in phases.

References

Skyscrapers in Mecca
Proposed skyscrapers
Proposed buildings and structures in Saudi Arabia